This is a list of botanical illustrators who were/are active or born in Australia.

Botanical illustration involves the painting, drawing and illustration of plants and ecosystems. Often meticulously observed, the botanical art tradition combines both science and art, and botanical artists throughout the centuries have been active in collecting and cataloguing a huge variety of species.

Australian botanical illustrators

A
 Beverley Allen
 Mary Morton Allport (1806–1895) - born Birmingham, England
 Annick Ansselin - born in France, lives in Tasmania, Australia. Member of Botaniko
 Alison Marjorie Ashby (1901–1987) - botanical artist and plant collector
 Louisa Atkinson (1834–1872) - writer, botanist and illustrator

B
 Kim Bagot-Hiller (born 1975) - born in New South Wales 
 Ferdinand Bauer (1760–1826) - born in Feldsberg, Austria; travelled on Matthew Flinders' expedition to Australia
Susannah Blaxill - born in NSW, trained in UK and returned to Australia in 1992

C
 Kaye Chin
 Margaret Castle - born in Kyabram, Victoria, Australia
 Elizabeth Vivienne Conabere (1929–2009) - born in Alexandra, Victoria, botanical artist, writer and conservationist

D
 Luke Davis (born 1982) - born in Victoria, Australia
 Edgar Dell (1901–2008) - born in England
 Pauline Dewar (born 1955) - born in Perth, Australia

E
 Lesley Elkan (born 1972) - born in Sydney
 Melinda Edstein - born in Sydney

F
 Susan Fereday (1815–1878) - born in Leicestershire, England
 Margaret Flockton (1861–1963) - born in Sussex, England
 Sandra Ford
 Margaret Forrest (1844–1929) - born in Le Havre, France

G
 E. E. Gostelow (1866–1944) - born in Sydney, NSW
 Beverley Graham (1932–2010) - born in Melbourne, Victoria

H
 Tanya Hoolihan - born in western NSW
 Malcolm Ian Howie (1900–1936) - born in Creswick, Victoria.
 Annie Hughes - born in Sydney

I
 Anabella Innes (1826–1916) - born in Bathurst, died in Scotland. Her paintings are now kept at the National Museum of Australia in Canberra  Born Annabella Innes in 1826 in Bathurst. She moved to Port Macquarie as a 16yo after the death of her father. She lived in Port Macquarie with her mother at her Uncle's home from 1843-1848. She published her watercolours under her married name Boswell.

K

L
 John Lewin (1770–1819) - born in England
 Angela Lober (born 1966) - born in Sydney
 Marina Lommerse - born in Stamford, England. Cited in: Artists of Perth, Editor: Gabi Mills, M&P Publishing, Perth, Australia, 2017

M
 Kathleen McArthur (1915–2001) - born in Brisbane, Queensland
 Edward Minchen (1852–1913) - born in Middle Swan, Perth, Western Australia
 Steffi Michalski (born 1995) - born in New South Wales, Australia

N
 Philippa Nikulinsky (born 1942) - born in Kalgoorlie, WA
 Leonie Norton (born 1948) Sydney NSW

O

P
 Sydney Parkinson (c. 1745–1771) - born in Scotland
 Emily Pelloe (1878–1941) - born in St Kilda, Victoria
 Jacqueline Pemberton (born 1958) - born in Andover, England 
 Jenny Phillips (1942–2018)
 Olive Pink (1884–1975) - born in Hobart, Tasmania

Q

R
 Lewis Roberts (born 1950)
 Celia Rosser (born 1930)
 Ellis Rowan (1847?–1922) - born near Longwood, Victoria

S
 Vera Scarth-Johnson (1912–1999) - born in Yorkshire, England
 Margaret Stones (1920–2018) - born in Colac, Victoria
 Louise Janette Saunders (born 1955) - born in Benalla, Victoria

T
 Emil Todt (1810–1900) - born in Berlin, Germany

U V W
 Patricia Weeks (born 1938) - Alice Springs, Central Australia; born in Melbourne
 Jennifer Wilkinson (born 1947) - born in Tasmania

X Y Z

See also
 Australian National Botanic Gardens

References
 Botanical Art School of Melbourne
 Shirley Sherwood's books on botanical illustration

External links
Olive Pink Botanic Garden
Nature's Powerhouse: Cooktown Botanic Gardens
Australian women wildflower artists: Women of Flowers: Botanical Art in Australia from the 1830s to the 1960s (2009)

Botanical illustrators

Botanical, Australian